Donald Price may refer to:

 Donald L. Price (born c. 1935), American neuropathologist
 Donald D. Price (1942–2016), American neuroscientist and psychologist

See also
 Don K. Price (1910–1995), American political scientist